Adriaan Theodoor Basilius (Ad) Peperzak (born 3 July 1929) is a Dutch educator, editor and author.

Biography 
Peperzak was born on the island of Java (Indonesia) as a Dutch citizen. He studied philosophy at the Franciscan monastery schools in Venray, and theology in La Verna and Weert (in the Netherlands). He obtained a licentiate in philosophy at the Higher Institute of Philosophy of the Université catholique de Louvain in Louvain (Belgium) and a Ph.D. in the Humanities at the University of Paris (Sorbonne) in Paris. His Ph.D. dissertation Le jeune Hegel et la vision morale du monde (director: Paul Ricoeur), was published in 1960 and republished in 1969.

Work 
Peperzak's research in the history of philosophy has focused on Hegel (six books and numerous articles) and Emmanuel Levinas (two books and three others edited). He also published on Plato, Aristotle, Bonaventure, Descartes, Heidegger, and Ricoeur, and on thematic questions in ethics, social and political philosophy, metaphilosophy, and the philosophy of religion.

He is a member of the board of editors for Fordham University Press series Perspectives in Continental Philosophy. He is Arthur J. Schmitt Professor of Philosophy at Loyola University Chicago. Before, he was a professor at the Radboud University of Nijmegen (Department of Metaphysics & Epistemology), and at Utrecht University (History of Modern Philosophy) for several years.

Bibliography
 Le jeune Hegel et la vision morale du monde (1960, 1969)
 Der heutige Mensch und die Heilsfrage (1972)
 Philosophy and Politics: A Commentary on the Preface to Hegel's Philosophy of Right (1987) 
 Selbsterkenntnis des Absoluten - Grundlinien der Hegelschen Philosophie des Geistes. Spekulation und Erfahrung, Texte und Untersuchungen zum Deutschen Idealismus (1987)
 Hegels praktische Philosophie - Ein Kommentar zur enzyklopädischen Darstellung der menschlichen Freiheit und ihre objektiven Verwirklichung (1991)
 Modern Freedom, Hegel's Legal, Moral, and Political Philosophy
 To the Other: An Introduction to the Philosophy of Emmanuel Levinas (1993)
 Beyond: The Philosophy of Emmanuel Levinas (1997)
 Before Ethics (1997)
 Reason In Faith - On The Relevance Of Christian Spirituality For Philosophy (1997)
 Platonic Transformations (1997)
 The Quest for Meaning - Friends of Wisdom, from Plato to Levinas (2003)
 Elements of Ethics (2003)
 Philosophy between Faith and Theology - addresses to catholic intellectuals (2005)
 Thinking. From Solitude to Dialogue and Contemplation (2006)
 Aanspraak en Bezinning (2007)

References

Curriculum Vitae

Living people
20th-century Dutch philosophers
21st-century Dutch philosophers
Hegelian philosophers
Phenomenologists
Continental philosophers
Philosophy academics
KU Leuven alumni
University of Paris alumni
Academic staff of Radboud University Nijmegen
Academic staff of Utrecht University
Loyola University Chicago faculty
People from Malang
1929 births
Levinas scholars